{{Album ratings
| rev1 = Allmusic
| rev1Score = <ref name="AM">{{cite web |first=Sharon |last=Mawer |title=The Lightning Seeds: 'The Very Best of The Lightning Seeds > Review |url= |publisher=Allmusic |accessdate=August 6, 2010}}</ref>
| noprose = yes
}}The Very Best of The Lightning Seeds is the second official greatest hits album by British alternative rock band The Lightning Seeds. It was released on 12 June 2006, peaking at number 33 on the UK Album Chart.

The compilation is essentially an update of the group's first greatest hits album 1997's Like You Do... Best of The Lightning Seeds. The compilations share 12 tracks between them. The Very Best drops the group's third single "All I Want" and replaces the original recording of "Three Lions" with the 1998 re-recording. The compilation includes a pair of b-side covers ("Be My Baby", "Lucifer Sam"), two songs from 1998's commercial failure Tilt'', "Song for No One" - a remix of a song from Broudie's solo-album - and the new recording "Tables Have Turned".

Track listing

Charts

References

2006 greatest hits albums
The Lightning Seeds albums
Albums produced by Ian Broudie